
Mad Love may refer to:

Books
Mad Love (French L'amour fou), collection of poems by André Breton 
The Batman Adventures: Mad Love, an Eisner and Harvey award-winning comic by Paul Dini and Bruce Timm
Mad Love (publisher), a short-lived comic book publisher, best known for publishing Alan Moore's Big Numbers

Film and television
Mad Love (1920 film), starring Lina Cavalieri
Mad Love, the U.S. distribution title for the 1921 German film Sappho starring Pola Negri
Mad Love (1935 film), a 1935 American film starring Peter Lorre
L'Amour fou, a 1969 French film
Mad Love (1995 film), a 1995 American film starring Drew Barrymore
Mad Love (2001 film), a 2001 Spanish film
Mad Love (TV series), a 2011 television series
Mad Love (2015 film), a 2015 French film
"Mad Love" (The New Batman Adventures), a 1999 episode of the animated series The New Batman Adventures

Music

Albums
Mad Love (Linda Ronstadt album), a 1980 album by Linda Ronstadt
Mad Love (Robi Draco Rosa album), a concept album by Robi Dräco Rosa
Mad Love (EP), a 1990 extended play album by Lush
Mad Love. (JoJo album), a 2016 album by JoJo

Songs
"Mad Love" (Sean Paul and David Guetta song), by Sean Paul and David Guetta
”Mad Love.” (JoJo song), a 2016 song by JoJo
"Mad Love" (Mabel song), a 2019 song by Mabel
"Mad Love", a song by Bush from Black and White Rainbows
"Mad Love", a song by Dido from the album Still on My Mind
"Mad Love", a song by Linda Ronstadt from the album Mad Love
"Mad Love", a song by Neon Trees from the album Picture Show
"Mad Love", a song by The Pretty Reckless from the album Who You Selling For
"Mad Love", a song by The Veronicas from the self-titled album The Veronicas

See also
Amour fou (disambiguation)